Homatula is a genus of stone loaches endemic to China.

Species
There are currently 14 recognized species in this genus:
 Homatula acuticephala (W. Zhou & J. C. He, 1993)
 Homatula anguillioides (S. Q. Zhu & S. H. Wang, 1985)
 Homatula change Endruweit, 2015 
 Homatula disparizona R. Min, J. X. Yang & X. Y. Chen, 2013 
 Homatula erhaiensis (S. Q. Zhu & W. X. Cao, 1988)
 Homatula laxiclathra J. H. Gu & E. Zhang, 2012 
 Homatula longidorsalis (J. X. Yang, Y. R. Chen & Kottelat, 1994)
 Homatula nanpanjiangensis (R. Min, X. Y. Chen & J. X. Yang, 2010)
 Homatula oligolepis (W. X. Cao & S. Q. Zhu, 1989)
 Homatula potanini (Günther, 1896)
 Homatula pycnolepis Y. T. Hu & E. Zhang, 2010
 Homatula variegata (Dabry de Thiersant, 1874)
 Homatula wujiangensis R. H. Ding & Q. X. Deng, 1990
 Homatula wuliangensis R. Min, J. X. Yang & X. Y. Chen, 2012

References

Nemacheilidae
Taxa named by John Treadwell Nichols
Fish of Asia
Fish of China